The 1969 Star World Championships were held in San Diego, United States in 1969.

Results

References

1969 in sailing
Star World Championships in the United States
San Fran California